Telecommunications in the Falkland Islands  includes radio, television, fixed and mobile telephones, and the Internet.

Radio and television

 Radio: Radio services provided by the public broadcaster, Falkland Islands Radio Service, broadcasting on both AM and FM frequencies, and by the British Forces Broadcasting Service (BFBS) (2007).
 Radio sets: 1,000 (1997).

The Falkland Islands Radio Service (FIRS) operates a radio network in conjunction with the BBC World Service, while the British Forces Broadcasting Service (BFBS) operates three networks of its own. KTV Ltd. also operates two relay stations, KTV Radio Nova, a rebroadcast of BBC World Service, and KTV Radio Nova Saint FM, a rebroadcast of Saint FM. 

 Television: TV service provided by a multi-channel service provider (2007).
 Television sets: 1,008 (2001).

Six free-to-air digital channels are provided by BFBS: BBC One, BBC Two, ITV, Channel 4, Sky News and BFBS Extra for non-military audiences. Entitled personnel within British Forces South Atlantic can also receive Sky Sports 1, Sky Sports 2 and BFBS Sport.

A local subscription service, KTV carries satellite channels such as ESPN, Discovery, CNN International and Turner Classic Movies (from the United States) along with BBC World News from the United Kingdom.

Telephones

 Calling code: +500
 International call prefix: 00
 Main lines: 1,980 lines in use (2012), 218th in the world.
 Mobile cellular: 3,450 lines, 216th in the world (2012); Cable & Wireless launched "Touch" a GSM 900 mobile service during December 2005; Roaming became partially available in April 2007 depending on providers.
 Domestic: Government-operated radiotelephone and private VHF/CB radiotelephone networks provide effective service to almost all points on both islands (2011). Services in Stanley are delivered via fibre optic and copper. Telephone penetration by household is 100%.
 Satellite earth station: 1 Intelsat (Atlantic Ocean) with links through the United Kingdom to other countries (2011).

Internet

 Top-level domain: .fk
 Internet users: 2,842 users, 208th in the world; 96.9% of the population, 1st in the world (2012).
 Fixed broadband: 1,187 subscriptions, 179th in the world; 40.5% of the population, 5th in the world (2012).
 Wireless broadband: unknown (2012).
 Internet hosts: 110 hosts, 207th in the world (2012).
 Internet Service Providers (ISPs): Sure South Atlantic (formerly Cable & Wireless). 
 ADSL services were launched in Stanley in mid-2006.

References

External links

 KTV, website.
 Station History, Falkland Islands Radio Service (FIRS).
 How it all started, Saint FM (Falklands).
 Sure Falkland Islands History, Sure South Atlantic, the successor to Cable & Wireless.

Falkland Islands
 
+Falkland